Hermansky–Pudlak syndrome 4 protein is a protein that in humans is encoded by the HPS4 gene.

Hermansky–Pudlak syndrome is a disorder of organelle biogenesis in which oculocutaneous albinism, bleeding, and pulmonary fibrosis result from defects of melanosomes, platelet dense granules, and lysosomes. Mutations in this gene as well as several others can cause this syndrome. The protein encoded by this gene appears to be important in organelle biogenesis and is similar to the mouse 'light ear' protein. Five transcript variants encoding different isoforms have been found for this gene. In addition, transcript variants utilizing alternative polyadenylation signals exist.

In melanocytic cells HPS4 gene expression may be regulated by MITF.

References

External links
  GeneReviews/NCBI/NIH/UW entry on Hermansky–Pudlak syndrome

Further reading